This is a list of political offices which have been held by a woman, with details of the first woman holder of each office. It is ordered by the countries in Oceania and by dates of appointment. Please observe that this list is meant to contain only the first woman to hold of a political office, and not all the female holders of that office.

Australia

 Local government councillor – Grace Benny – 1919
 Member of a state parliament – Edith Cowan (Western Australia) – 1921
 Mayor – Lilian Fowler – 1938
 Member of the House of Representatives – Dame Enid Lyons – 1943
 Member of the Senate – Dorothy Tangney – 1943
 Member of Federal Cabinet – Dame Enid Lyons (Vice-President of the Executive Council) – 1949
 Member of a state or territory cabinet – Florence Cardell-Oliver (Western Australia, Minister for Health) – 1949
 Member of the federal ministry (with a portfolio) – Dame Annabelle Rankin (Minister for Housing) – 1966
 Leader of the government in an upper house – Phyllis Benjamin (Tasmania) – 1968
 Member of Federal Cabinet (with a portfolio) – Margaret Guilfoyle (Minister for Education) – 1975
 Lord Mayor – Joy Cummings (Newcastle) – 1975
 Leader of a parliamentary party – Elisabeth Kirkby (Australian Democrats, New South Wales) – 1981
Leader of a federal parliamentary party – Janine Haines (Australian Democrats) – 1986
 Speaker of the House of Representatives – Joan Child – 1986
 Head of a state or territory government – Rosemary Follett (Australian Capital Territory) – 1989
 Chief Minister – Rosemary Follett (Australian Capital Territory) – 1989
 Leader of a state or territory opposition – Rosemary Follett (Australian Capital Territory) – 1989
 State Premier – Carmen Lawrence (Western Australia) – 1990
 State Governor – Dame Roma Mitchell (South Australia) – 1991
 President of the Senate – Margaret Reid – 1996 
 Leadership position in a major party – Jenny Macklin (Deputy Leader, Labor Party) – 2001
 Deputy Prime Minister – Julia Gillard – 2007
 Governor-General – Quentin Bryce – 2008
 Leader of a major party – Julia Gillard (Leader, Labor Party) – 2010
 Prime Minister – Julia Gillard – 2010 
 Foreign Minister – Julie Bishop – 2013

Australian Capital Territory

 Elected Member of the Australian Capital Territory Advisory Council – Mary Stevenson – 1951
 Member of the Australian Capital Territory House of Assembly – Ros Kelly, Susan Ryan and Maureen Worsley – 1975
 Minority Leader of the Australian Capital Territory House of Assembly - Maurene Horder – 1983
 Chief Minister of the Australian Capital Territory – Rosemary Follett – 1989
 Leader of the Opposition – Rosemary Follett – 1989
 Speaker of the Australian Capital Territory Legislative Assembly – Roberta McRae – 1992
 Deputy Chief Minister of the Australian Capital Territory – Katy Gallagher – 2006

New South Wales

 Member of the New South Wales Legislative Assembly – Millicent Preston-Stanley – 1925
 Member of the New South Wales Legislative Council – Catherine Green and Ellen Webster – 1931
 Cabinet Minister – Janice Crosio – 1984 (She became the Minister for Natural Resources.)
 President of the New South Wales Legislative Council – Virginia Chadwick – 1998
 Leader of the Opposition – Kerry Chikarovski – 1999
 Governor of New South Wales – Marie Bashir – 2001
 Lord Mayor of Sydney – Lucy Turnbull – 2003
 Deputy Premier of New South Wales – Carmel Tebbutt – 2008
 Premier of New South Wales – Kristina Keneally – 2009
 Speaker of the New South Wales Legislative Assembly – Shelley Hancock – 2011

Northern Territory

 Member of the Northern Territory Legislative Council – Lyn Berlowitz – 1960
 Member of the Northern Territory Legislative Assembly – Liz Andrew, Dawn Lawrie – 1974
 Lord Mayor of Darwin – Ella Stack – 1975
 Cabinet Minister – Noel Padgham-Purich – 1983 (She became the Minister for Housing and Conservation.)
 Leader of the Opposition – Maggie Hickey – 1996
 Speaker of the Northern Territory Legislative Assembly – Loraine Braham – 1997
 Chief Minister of the Northern Territory – Clare Martin – 2001
 Deputy Chief Minister of the Northern Territory – Marion Scrymgour – 2007
 Administrator of the Northern Territory – Sally Thomas – 2011

Queensland

 Member of the Queensland Legislative Assembly – Irene Longman – 1929
 Lord Mayor of Brisbane – Sallyanne Atkinson – 1985
 Cabinet Minister – Yvonne Chapman – 1986 (She became the Minister for Welfare Services, Youth and Ethnic Affairs.)
 Governor of Queensland – Leneen Forde – 1992
 Deputy Premier of Queensland – Joan Sheldon – 1996
 Premier of Queensland – Anna Bligh – 2007
 Leader of the Opposition – Annastacia Palaszczuk – 2012
 Speaker of the Legislative Assembly – Fiona Simpson – 2012

South Australia
 Member of the South Australian House of Assembly – Joyce Steele – 1959
 Member of the South Australian Legislative Council – Jessie Cooper – 1959
 Cabinet Minister – Joyce Steele (Minister for Education) – 1968
 Lord Mayor of Adelaide – Wendy Chapman – 1983
 President of the South Australian Legislative Council – Anne Levy – 1986
 Governor of South Australia – Dame Roma Mitchell – 1991
 Leader of the Opposition – Isobel Redmond – 2009
 Speaker of the South Australian House of Assembly – Lyn Breuer – 2010

Tasmania
 Member of the Tasmanian Legislative Council – Margaret McIntyre – 1948
 Members of the Tasmanian House of Assembly – Amelia Best, Mabel Miller – 1955
 Cabinet Minister – Gillian James – 1980 (She became the Minister for Public and Mental Health, Consumer Affairs and Administrative Services.)
 Party Leader – Christine Milne (Tasmanian Greens) – 1993
 Leader of the Opposition – Sue Napier – 1999
 President of the Tasmanian Legislative Council – Sue Smith – 2008
 Premier of Tasmania – Lara Giddings – 2011
 Speaker of the Tasmanian House of Assembly – Elise Archer – 2014
 Governor of Tasmania – Kate Warner – 2014

Victoria

 Member of the Victorian Legislative Assembly – Millie Peacock – 1933
 Member of the Victorian Legislative Council – Gracia Baylor – 1979
 Cabinet Minister – Pauline Toner (Minister for Community Welfare Services) – 1982
 Lord Mayor of Melbourne – Alexis Ord – 1986
 Deputy Premier of Victoria – Joan Kirner – 1989
 Premier of Victoria – Joan Kirner – 1990
 Leader of the Opposition – Joan Kirner – 1992
 Speaker of the Victorian Legislative Assembly – Judy Maddigan – 2003
 President of the Victorian Legislative Council – Monica Gould – 2003
 Governor of Victoria – Linda Dessau – 2015

Western Australia

 Member of the Western Australian Legislative Assembly – Edith Cowan – 1921
 Member of the Western Australian Legislative Council – Ruby Hutchison – 1954
 Cabinet Minister – Florence Cardell-Oliver (Minister for Health) – 1947
 Premier of Western Australia – Carmen Lawrence – 1990
 Leader of the Opposition – Carmen Lawrence – 1993
 Lord Mayor of Perth – Lisa Scaffidi – 2007
 Governor of Western Australia – Kerry Sanderson – 2014
 Deputy Premier of Western Australia — Liza Harvey – 2016
 President of the Western Australian Legislative Council – Kate Doust – 2017

Cook Islands
 Member of Parliament – Fanaura Kingstone – 1983
 Minister of Internal Affairs and Postmistress General – Fanaura Kingstone – 1983

Fiji
Members of Parliament: Losalini Raravuya Dovi, Loloma Livingston, and Irene Jai Narayan – 1966
 Minister of Culture – Litia Cakobau – 1987

French Polynesia
 Minister of Social Affairs, Housing and Unity  – Huguette Hong-Kiou – 1982

Kiribati
Gilbert and Ellice Islands (British colony):
 Member of the House of Assembly – Tekarei Russell – 1971
 Member of Cabinet (Minister of Health) – Tekarei Russell – 1975

Kiribati:
 Vice President – Teima Onorio – 2003

Marshall Islands

 Senator (i.e., member of the Nitijeļā, the unicameral legislature) – Evelyn Konou – 1978
 Member of Cabinet – Evelyn Konou, as Minister for Health Services and the Environment – 1993
 President – Hilda Heine – 2016

Federated States of Micronesia
 Member of Congress – Perpetua Sappa Konman - 2021

Nauru
 Member of Parliament – Ruby Dediya (subsequently known as Ruby Thoma) – 1986
 Member of Cabinet – Ruby Dediya – 1986 (as Minister for Finance)

New Zealand

  
 Mayor – Elizabeth Yates – 1894
 Member of Parliament – Elizabeth McCombs – 1933
 Cabinet Minister – Mabel Howard – 1947
 Mayor of Auckland City – Dame Catherine Tizard – 1983
 Governor-General – Dame Catherine Tizard – 1990
 Deputy Prime Minister – Helen Clark – 1989
 Mayor of Christchurch – Vicki Buck – 1989
 Minister of Finance – Ruth Richardson – 1990
 Mayor of Wellington – Fran Wilde – 1992
 Leader of the Opposition – Helen Clark – 1993
 Prime Minister – Jenny Shipley – 1997
Chief Justice – Sian Elias – 1999
 Attorney-General – Margaret Wilson – 1999
 Speaker of the House of Representatives – Margaret Wilson – 2005
Minister of Justice - Annette King - 2007-2008

Palau

 Minister of Administration and Budget – Sandra Pierantozzi – 1989
 Foreign Minister – Sandra Pierantozzi – 2009

Papua New Guinea

Member of the Legislative Council – Doris Booth – 1951
 Member of Parliament – Dame Josephine Abaijah – 1972
 Cabinet Minister – Nahau Rooney, as Minister for Justice – 1977

Samoa
Member of the Legislative Assembly – Faimaala Filipo – 1970
 Minister of Culture, Youth and Sports – Fiame Naomi Mata'afa – 1991
 Minister of Justice and Courts Administration - Fiame Naomi Mata'afa - 2011

Solomon Islands
Member of the Legislative Council – Lilly Ogatina Poznanski – 1965
 Member of Parliament – Hilda Kari – 1989
 Member of Cabinet – Hilda Kari – 1993

Tonga
 Member of the Legislative Assembly – Princess Mele Siuʻilikutapu – 1975
 Cabinet of Tonga – ‘Alisi Taumoepeau – 2006
Attorney General and Minister of Justice - 'Alisi Taumoepeau (2006)

Tuvalu
 Member of Parliament – Naama Maheu Latasi – 1989 (She became the country's first female Cabinet Minister upon becoming the Minister for Health)

Vanuatu
 Member of Parliament – Hilda Lini and Maria Crowby – 1987
 Member of Cabinet – Hilda Lini, as Minister for Rural Water Supply and Health – 1991
Minister of Justice, Culture and Women - Motarilavoa Hilda Lini - 1996

Footnotes and references

See also
List of elected and appointed female heads of state and government
List of elected and appointed female heads of state and government 
List of the first openly LGBT holders of political offices

Oceania

Oceania-related lists
Political office-holders in Oceania
Women in Oceania